Shahr Deraz (also Romanized as Shahr Derāz and Shahrdarāz; also known as Shahderāz and Shāh Derāz) is a village in Howmeh Rural District, in the Central District of Iranshahr County, Sistan and Baluchestan Province, Iran. At the 2006 census, its population was 3,101, in 654 families.

References 

Populated places in Iranshahr County